Erik Read (born May 31, 1991) is a Canadian World Cup alpine ski racer specializing the technical events of slalom and giant slalom. Born and raised in Calgary, Alberta, he represented Canada at two Winter Olympics and five World Championships.

Career
At his first World Championships in 2015 at Beaver Creek, USA, Read finished in the top thirty in giant slalom and  slalom. He was also in the Nations Team Event (NTE), in which Canada won the silver medal. He competed in slalom and giant slalom at the 2018 Winter Olympics.

Read is a two-time Canadian champion in slalom (2013 and 2014) and won the overall title in the North American Cup (Nor-Am Cup) in 2012.

He graduated from the University of Denver and competed for the Pioneers in alpine skiing.

Read's parents are famous Canadian ski racers Ken and Lynda (Robbins) Read; his father was one of the Crazy Canucks downhill racers of the late 1970s and early 1980s. Younger brother Jeffrey (b.1997) is also a World Cup alpine racer specializing in speed events.

In January 2022, Read was named to Canada's Olympic team.

World Cup results

Season standings

Top ten finishes

 0 podiums
 8 top tens – (5 GS, 1 SL, 1 AC, 1 PG)

World Championship results

Olympic results

References

External links
 
 
 Erik Read at Alpine Canada
 Erik Read at Fischer Sports
 Erik Read at University of Denver Athletics

1991 births
Living people
Skiers from Calgary
Canadian male alpine skiers
Denver Pioneers athletes
Alpine skiers at the 2018 Winter Olympics
Alpine skiers at the 2022 Winter Olympics
Olympic alpine skiers of Canada